The Wanda River, also spelled Wanta River is a river in Taiwan. It flows through Taichung for 37 km.

See also
List of rivers in Taiwan

References

Rivers of Taiwan
Landforms of Taichung